Ianthe Astley-Boden (born 20 February 1975) is a former Australian rugby union player. She made all three test appearances for Australia at the 2002 Rugby World Cup in Spain. She was named on the bench for the Wallaroos squad to face the Black Ferns in their final pool game.

References 

1975 births
Living people
Australian female rugby union players
Australia women's international rugby union players